The 2008–09 Pittsburgh Penguins season was the 42nd season of Pittsburgh Penguins in the National Hockey League (NHL). The regular season began with two games against the Ottawa Senators in Stockholm, Sweden on October 4 and October 5, 2008.

On February 15, the team had a record of 27–25–5 and was five points out of playoff position. The organization fired head coach Michel Therrien and replaced him with Dan Bylsma, head coach of the organization's American Hockey League affiliate in Wilkes-Barre. On February 26, the team traded defenseman Ryan Whitney to the Anaheim Ducks in return for Chris Kunitz. Before the trade deadline on March 4, they acquired Bill Guerin from the New York Islanders. Under Bylsma, the team went 18–3–4, including 10–1–2 in March, and lost only one home game.

The Penguins qualified for the playoffs for the third consecutive season. They did not repeat as champions of the Atlantic Division, but earned the fourth seed in the Eastern Conference with 99 points. They began the 2009 Stanley Cup playoffs on April 15 against the Philadelphia Flyers. They beat the Flyers, Washington Capitals, and Carolina Hurricanes to earn a second-straight berth in the Stanley Cup Final. In the Finals, the Penguins defeated the Detroit Red Wings in seven games in a rematch of the previous season's Stanley Cup Final to win the franchise's third league title. To date, this is the only Stanley Cup the Penguins have won without having home-ice advantage.

Pre-season
Due to their appearance in the 2008 Stanley Cup Finals, the Penguins had less than three weeks before free agency began to settle numerous contract decisions. The Penguins added nine free agents and lost ten to other teams. Head Coach Michel Therrien also signed a new three-year contract that replaced the last year of his existing contract, with an increase in salary. The new contract was projected to keep him with the Penguins through the 2010–11 season.

The Penguins renewed 99% of their season ticket sales from the 2007–08 season; having sold out 67 consecutive games at Mellon Arena dating back to the 2006–07 season. In July, ESPN named Pittsburgh the top team in the Eastern Conference, and Sporting News predicted the team would finish in the league's fifth overall position.

The team commenced training camp on September 16, 2008 in Pittsburgh. They played five pre-season games in preparation for the season, finishing with a 4–0–1 record. The team concluded its preparation for the season with practices in Stockholm. Defensemen Sergei Gonchar was injured in the pre-season opener and originally anticipated to miss "four to six months." He appeared for the first time on February 14, 2009. With Gonchar out of the lineup and previous season's two other alternate captains Ryan Malone and Gary Roberts departed, the Penguins began the season with no returning alternate captains in the lineup. Therrien selected two alternate captains each month; Evgeni Malkin and Brooks Orpik served the role throughout the opening month.

|- style="background:#ffc;"
| 1 || September 20 || Tampa Bay ||5–4||Pittsburgh||SO||Fleury||16,287||0–0–1||
|- style="background:#cfc;"
| 2 || September 22 || Pittsburgh ||3–2||Tampa Bay||||Curry||14,707||1–0–1||
|- style="background:#cfc;"
| 3 || September 24 || Toronto||2–3||Pittsburgh||||Sabourin||15,731||2–0–1||
|- style="background:#cfc;"
| 4 || September 26 || Pittsburgh ||5–4||Toronto||||Fleury||18,884||3–0–1||
|- style="background:#cfc;"
| 5 || October 2 || Pittsburgh ||4–1||Jokerit (SML)||||Fleury||13,464||4–0–1||
|-

|-
| Legend:       = Win       = Loss       = OT/SO Loss

Regular season

October

On September 27, the Penguins embarked on a trip for Sweden where they opened the season against the Ottawa Senators, at the Stockholm Globe Arena. The Penguins were one of four teams to participate in NHL Premiere which began the season with games in Prague, Czech Republic and Stockholm, Sweden. Pittsburgh won the opening game of the season in overtime, getting two goals from Tyler Kennedy, including the game-winner. The game was broadcast on Mellon Arena's JumboTron where 2,300 spectators watched the game. The team returned to Pittsburgh after ten days in Europe and a 1–1–0 record. The Penguins hosted the Trib Total Media Faceoff Festival 2008 prior to their first four home games, allowing fans to watch the games on 9-by-12 foot LED screen outside of Mellon Arena. On October 18, Sidney Crosby scored one goal in addition to three assists to surpass benchmarks of 100 goals, 200 assists, and 300 total points for his career. In the same game, Evgeni Malkin assisted on four goals, giving him 200 total career points.

The Penguins received continued fan support from their previous season. In addition to extending a home sellout streak to 72 games on October 23, the Penguins ranked 113% above the national average for male television viewers aged 18 to 34. The franchise ranked as the 18th most valuable in the league at US$195 million, marking a 26% increase from the past season. According to Forbes, the franchise's revenue would likely put the Penguins into the top ten after their new arena, Consol Energy Center, opened in 2010. The Penguins finished October with a 3–1–1 record in Pittsburgh and concluded the month with three consecutive road losses.

November

The Penguins won their first six games in November before losing in a shootout on November 18. Rob Scuderi and Hal Gill were selected by Therrien to be November's alternate captains, taking over for Brooks Orpik and Malkin who served in October. On November 11, the Penguins returned to Detroit for the first time since the 2008 Stanley Cup Finals. The third goal of Jordan Staal's second career hat-trick came with 22.8 seconds remaining in regulation, sending the game into overtime where the Penguins achieved a 7–6 victory. Malkin's 13-game point streak ended on November 18, during the streak he scored 27 points. Through November 19, the Penguins led the league in overtime games with nine of 18 games taking extra time to decide. Through the first 20 games of the season, Mike Zigomanis led the league in faceoff percentage and Alex Goligoski led rookie defensemen in points. After an injury to Marc-Andre Fleury, Dany Sabourin and rookie John Curry split goaltending duties in his multi-game absence in which the team was 5–6–2. On November 26, Malkin scored three goals for his third career hat-trick, three days later Sidney Crosby also achieved a hat trick—the second of his career. After the team's final game of the month, Malkin and Crosby ranked first and second in league scoring with 39 and 34 points respectively. Malkin also ranked first in the league with 29 assists, and was named the NHL's second Star of the Month.

December

Therrien named Jordan Staal and Matt Cooke December's alternate captains. "I think it's important for our young group to try to extend the leadership group," the coach said of the decision. A survey by Turnkey Sports & Entertainment released on December 2 that surveyed fans of all 122 NFL, NBA, NHL and MLB teams ranked the Penguins eighth. The survey consisted of 21 categories such as entertainment value, commitment to winning, ticket value and likeability of the players and owners. Ranked 20th in the same poll in 2007, the Penguins were the second-ranked NHL team, behind the Detroit Red Wings. The Penguins began the month with seven games in eleven days in which they were 2–4–1. As of December 10, Crosby and Malkin continued to lead the league in points as well as leading voting for the All-Star Game in Montreal. On December 11, after losing three consecutive games, Petr Sykora and Pascal Dupuis each scored their first career hat-tricks in a 9–2 victory over the New York Islanders in Pittsburgh. It was the seventh time in the Penguins' history that two players scored a hat-trick in the same game, the first since 1993.

On December 21, Sidney Crosby surpassed the record for most All-Star Game votes at 1,020,736, set by Jaromir Jagr, then with the Penguins, in 2000. Crosby broke the record with 13 days remaining in voting. Defenceman Ryan Whitney made his first appearance of the season on December 23, after missing 33 games with a foot injury. On December 26, Marc-Andre Fleury made 37 saves in Pittsburgh's first shutout of the season, defeating the New Jersey Devils, 1–0. After concluding the month with a 5–8–1 record, the team held a players-only meeting on December 30. "The attitude is a little off right now," said Brooks Orpik, "It's easy to be a good team when you're winning games. When you're going through rough batches like this, it's what tests guys' character."

January
The Penguins began 2009 with three consecutive losses, extending their losing streak to five games—the most consecutive since 2006. During the streak, the Penguins fell from second to ninth place in the Eastern Conference and failed to score on 32 consecutive power plays.

Sidney Crosby and Evgeni Malkin led all players in voting for the 2009 All-Star Game. However, Crosby did not play due to a knee injury. The top vote-getter for the second year in a row, Crosby also missed the 2008 All-Star Game. On January 8, the team announced that they had agreed to a four-year contract extension with Jordan Staal worth $16 million. Staal's rookie contract was set to expire at the end of the season. He was the Penguins first round pick, second overall in 2006.

The team suffered from injuries, culminating in January where at one point they had eight starters injured. Mike Zigomanis had been inactive since December 3 and Ruslan Fedotenko was ruled out for four to six weeks after breaking his hand on January 6. Sergei Gonchar practiced with the team for the first time on January 16 after suffering a separated shoulder during the pre-season. By that time, the Penguins had lost 173 man-games due to injury, after losing 239 in the entire 2007–08 season. With a 3–0 victory over the New York Rangers on January 18, the Penguins won a second consecutive game for the first time since November 15. However, the team was unable to capitalize and lost their last game before the All-Star break to the Carolina Hurricanes. The Penguins entered the break with a 23–21–4 record. The team's 50 points put them in tenth place in the Eastern Conference, two spots out of the playoffs.

February

On February 14, Sergei Gonchar made his season debut and Ruslan Fedotenko returned to the line-up after missing over a month due to a hand injury. On February 15—with the Penguins five points out of the playoffs—Therrien was replaced by Dan Bylsma, the coach of the Penguins' AHL affiliate Wilkes-Barre/Scranton, on an interim basis. Tom Fitzgerald was promoted from Director of Player Development to assistant coach for forwards, while Mike Yeo, already with the team, became assistant for the defensemen. Assistant Andre Savard was reassigned within the organization.

On February 21, Crosby recorded his 250th career assist in a 2-goal, 2-assist victory over the Philadelphia Flyers. On February 25, Fleury recorded his third shutout of the season, as the Penguins defeated the Islanders 1–0; the team remained two points out of the playoffs after the win. The day after the shutout, Ryan Whitney was traded to the Anaheim Ducks for Chris Kunitz and signing rights to prospect Eric Tangradi. In his first game after being traded to Pittsburgh, Kunitz recorded a goal and an assist as the Penguins defeated the Chicago Blackhawks in overtime.

March
The Penguins began March with five of six games on the road, before a homestand of eight consecutive games. Upon the Penguins' win on March 1, the team moved into eighth place in the Eastern Conference with 70 points. The NHL trade deadline was on March 4. On March 3, the Penguins placed Miroslav Satan on waivers to clear roster space for a trade. Before the deadline, the Penguins acquired New York Islanders' captain Bill Guerin in exchange for a conditional draft pick in the 2009 draft. The Penguins also exchanged minor league defensemen, sending Danny Richmond to the St. Louis Blues organization for Andy Wozniewski. They also claimed winger Craig Adams off waivers from the Chicago Blackhawks. Dan Bylsma surpassed Herb Brooks' record for the best record in his first ten games as a Penguins' coach. The team went a franchise-first 5–0–0 on a road trip at the beginning of March.

On March 15, the Penguins soldout their 100th consecutive game at the Mellon Arena. Evgeni Malkin recorded his 100th point of the season while tying a career-high five point game against the Atlanta Thrashers on March 17. On March 20, Vince Lascheid, Penguins and Pittsburgh Pirates organist of 33 years, died. Vice President of Communications Tom McMillan said, "[Lascheid] probably is the only organist in the history of professional sports to be inducted into a team Hall of Fame." The Penguins concluded March with eight consecutive games at the Mellon Arena—their longest homestand of the season.

April and season results

Pittsburgh finished their homestand with a 6–1–1 record, moving into fourth place in the Eastern Conference. The final game of the homestand was the most watched game of the season on FSN Pittsburgh, the Penguins regional television network. FSN Pittsburgh was the most-watched regional Fox network in the NHL for the second consecutive season. On April 7, Sidney Crosby scored his 100th point of the season, Evgeni Malkin acquired his 300th career point and Petr Sykora scored his 300th career goal, while the Penguins qualified for the post-season for the third consecutive season with a 6–4 win over the Tampa Bay Lightning. Tickets for Pittsburgh's first two opening round playoff games sold out within a few hours of going on sale. The team collected over $100,000 for the families of three Pittsburgh Police officers who were killed days before the game. The Penguins finished their regular season on April 12 with a win over the Montreal Canadiens. Through his first 25 games as Penguins' coach, Dan Blysma's 18–3–4 record amounted to 40 points—the second-most of any coach in NHL history through their first 25 games. The Penguins finished with a 45–28–9 record, for 99 points; fourth place in the Eastern Conference and second place in the Atlantic Division.

Evgeni Malkin won the Art Ross Trophy as the league's leading scorer with 113 points. Malkin followed Mario Lemieux, Jaromir Jagr and Crosby to become the fourth different Penguin to win the award. The award was the 13th overall for the Penguins since 1988.

Game log

|- style="background:#cfc;"
| 1 || 4 || 2:30 PM || Pittsburgh Penguins || 4–3 OT || Ottawa Senators || Ericsson Globe @ Stockholm, SWE (13,699) || 1–0–0 || 2
|- style="background:#fcf;"
| 2 || 5 || 2:30 PM || Ottawa Senators || 3–1 || Pittsburgh Penguins || Ericsson Globe @ Stockholm, SWE (13,699) || 1–1–0 || 2
|- style="background:#ffc;"
| 3 || 11 || 7:30 PM || New Jersey Devils || 2–1 OT || Pittsburgh Penguins || Civic Arena (17,132) || 1–1–1 || 3
|- style="background:#cfc;"
| 4 || 14 || 7:30 PM || Philadelphia Flyers || 2–3 OT || Pittsburgh Penguins || Civic Arena (16,965) || 2–1–1 || 5
|- style="background:#fcf;"
| 5 || 16 || 7:30 PM || Washington Capitals || 4–3 || Pittsburgh Penguins || Civic Arena (17,030) || 2–2–1 || 5
|- style="background:#cfc;"
| 6 || 18 || 7:00 PM || Toronto Maple Leafs || 1–4 || Pittsburgh Penguins || Civic Arena (17,033) || 3–2–1 || 7
|- style="background:#cfc;"
| 7 || 20 || 7:00 PM || Pittsburgh Penguins || 2–1 SO || Boston Bruins || TD Garden (17,565) || 4–2–1 || 9
|- style="background:#cfc;"
| 8 || 23 || 7:30 PM || Carolina Hurricanes || 1–4 || Pittsburgh Penguins || Civic Arena (17,132) || 5–2–1 || 11
|- style="background:#ffc;"
| 9 || 25 || 7:00 PM || Pittsburgh Penguins || 2–3 SO || New York Rangers || Madison Square Garden (IV) (18,200) || 5–2–2 || 12
|- style="background:#fcf;"
| 10 || 28 || 10:30 PM || Pittsburgh Penguins || 1–2 || San Jose Sharks || SAP Center at San Jose (17,496) || 5–3–2 || 12
|- style="background:#fcf;"
| 11 || 30 || 10:00 PM || Pittsburgh Penguins || 1–4 || Phoenix Coyotes || Gila River Arena (15,178) || 5–4–2 || 12
|-

|- style="background:#cfc;"
| 12 || 1 || 8:30 PM || Pittsburgh Penguins || 6–3 || St. Louis Blues || Scottrade Center (19,150) || 6–4–2 || 14
|- style="background:#cfc;"
| 13 || 6 || 7:00 PM || Edmonton Oilers || 4–5 || Pittsburgh Penguins || Civic Arena (16,971) || 7–4–2 || 16
|- style="background:#cfc;"
| 14 || 8 || 7:00 PM || Pittsburgh Penguins || 4–3 SO || New York Islanders || Nassau Veterans Memorial Coliseum (14,303) || 8–4–2 || 18
|- style="background:#cfc;"
| 15 || 11 || 7:00 PM || Pittsburgh Penguins || 7–6 OT || Detroit Red Wings || Joe Louis Arena (20,066) || 9–4–2 || 20
|- style="background:#cfc;"
| 16 || 13 || 7:30 PM || Philadelphia Flyers || 4–5 SO || Pittsburgh Penguins || Civic Arena (17,132) || 10–4–2 || 22
|- style="background:#cfc;"
| 17 || 15 || 7:30 PM || Buffalo Sabres || 2–5 || Pittsburgh Penguins || Civic Arena (17,132) || 11–4–2 || 24
|- style="background:#ffc;"
| 18 || 18 || 7:00 PM || Minnesota Wild || 2–1 SO || Pittsburgh Penguins || Civic Arena (16,971) || 11–4–3 || 25
|- style="background:#cfc;"
| 19 || 20 || 7:00 PM || Pittsburgh Penguins || 3–2 || Atlanta Thrashers || Philips Arena (13,391) || 12–4–3 || 27
|- style="background:#fcf;"
| 20 || 22 || 2:00 PM || Vancouver Canucks || 3–1 || Pittsburgh Penguins || Civic Arena (17,040) || 12–5–3 || 27
|- style="background:#cfc;"
| 21 || 26 || 7:00 PM || Pittsburgh Penguins || 5–3 || New York Islanders || Nassau Veterans Memorial Coliseum (14,871) || 13–5–3 || 29
|- style="background:#fcf;"
| 22 || 28 || 7:30 PM || Pittsburgh Penguins || 3–4 || Buffalo Sabres || First Niagara Center (18,690) || 13–6–3 || 29
|- style="background:#cfc;"
| 23 || 29 || 7:30 PM || New Jersey Devils || 1–4 || Pittsburgh Penguins || Civic Arena (17,132) || 14–6–3 || 31
|-

|- style="background:#ffc;"
| 24 || 3 || 7:00 PM || Pittsburgh Penguins || 2–3 SO || New York Rangers || Madison Square Garden (IV) (18,200) || 14–6–4 || 32
|- style="background:#cfc;"
| 25 || 4 || 7:00 PM || Pittsburgh Penguins || 5–2 || Carolina Hurricanes || PNC Arena (14,559) || 15–6–4 || 34
|- style="background:#fcf;"
| 26 || 6 || 2:00 PM || Pittsburgh Penguins || 2–3 || Ottawa Senators || Canadian Tire Centre (19,561) || 15–7–4 || 34
|- style="background:#fcf;"
| 27 || 8 || 7:30 PM || Buffalo Sabres || 4–3 || Pittsburgh Penguins || Civic Arena (16,976) || 15–8–4 || 34
|- style="background:#fcf;"
| 28 || 10 || 7:00 PM || Pittsburgh Penguins || 1–4 || New Jersey Devils || Prudential Center (16,808) || 15–9–4 || 34
|- style="background:#cfc;"
| 29 || 11 || 7:30 PM || New York Islanders || 2–9 || Pittsburgh Penguins || Civic Arena (16,972) || 16–9–4 || 36
|- style="background:#fcf;"
| 30 || 13 || 1:00 PM || Pittsburgh Penguins || 3–6 || Philadelphia Flyers || Wells Fargo Center (19,811) || 16–10–4 || 36
|- style="background:#cfc;"
| 31 || 18 || 7:00 PM || Pittsburgh Penguins || 6–3 || Atlanta Thrashers || Philips Arena (15,124) || 17–10–4 || 38
|- style="background:#fcf;"
| 32 || 20 || 7:00 PM || Toronto Maple Leafs || 7–3 || Pittsburgh Penguins || Civic Arena (17,053) || 17–11–4 || 38
|- style="background:#cfc;"
| 33 || 22 || 7:00 PM || Pittsburgh Penguins || 4–3 OT || Buffalo Sabres || First Niagara Center (18,690) || 18–11–4 || 40
|- style="background:#fcf;"
| 34 || 23 || 7:30 PM || Tampa Bay Lightning || 2–0 || Pittsburgh Penguins || Civic Arena (17,064) || 18–12–4 || 40
|- style="background:#cfc;"
| 35 || 26 || 7:00 PM || Pittsburgh Penguins || 1–0 || New Jersey Devils || Prudential Center (16,921) || 19–12–4 || 42
|- style="background:#fcf;"
| 36 || 27 || 7:00 PM || Montreal Canadiens || 3–2 || Pittsburgh Penguins || Civic Arena (17,132) || 19–13–4 || 42
|- style="background:#fcf;"
| 37 || 30 || 7:30 PM || Boston Bruins || 5–2 || Pittsburgh Penguins || Civic Arena (17,132) || 19–14–4 || 42
|-

|- style="background:#fcf;"
| 38 || 1 || 7:00 PM || Pittsburgh Penguins || 2–4 || Boston Bruins || TD Garden (17,565) || 19–15–4 || 42
|- style="background:#fcf;"
| 39 || 3 || 1:00 PM || Florida Panthers || 6–1 || Pittsburgh Penguins || Civic Arena (17,042) || 19–16–4 || 42
|- style="background:#fcf;"
| 40 || 5 || 7:00 PM || Pittsburgh Penguins || 0–4 || New York Rangers || Madison Square Garden (IV) (18,200) || 19–17–4 || 42
|- style="background:#cfc;"
| 41 || 6 || 7:30 PM || Atlanta Thrashers || 1–3 || Pittsburgh Penguins || Civic Arena (16,975) || 20–17–4 || 44
|- style="background:#fcf;"
| 42 || 8 || 8:00 PM || Pittsburgh Penguins || 3–5 || Nashville Predators || Bridgestone Arena (14,297) || 20–18–4 || 44
|- style="background:#fcf;"
| 43 || 10 || 3:00 PM || Pittsburgh Penguins || 3–5 || Colorado Avalanche || Pepsi Center (17,908) || 20–19–4 || 44
|- style="background:#cfc;"
| 44 || 13 || 7:00 PM || Pittsburgh Penguins || 4–2 || Philadelphia Flyers || Wells Fargo Center (19,872) || 21–19–4 || 46
|- style="background:#fcf;"
| 45 || 14 || 7:30 PM || Washington Capitals || 6–3 || Pittsburgh Penguins || Civic Arena (16,975) || 21–20–4 || 46
|- style="background:#cfc;"
| 46 || 16 || 7:30 PM || Anaheim Ducks || 1–3 || Pittsburgh Penguins || Civic Arena (17,005) || 22–20–4 || 48
|- style="background:#cfc;"
| 47 || 18 || 12:30 PM || New York Rangers || 0–3 || Pittsburgh Penguins || Civic Arena (17,024) || 23–20–4 || 50
|- style="background:#fcf;"
| 48 || 20 || 7:30 PM || Carolina Hurricanes || 2–1 || Pittsburgh Penguins || Civic Arena (16,972) || 23–21–4 || 50
|- style="background:#cfc;"
| 49 || 28 || 7:30 PM || New York Rangers || 2–6 || Pittsburgh Penguins || Civic Arena (16,965) || 24–21–4 || 52
|- style="background:#ffc;"
| 50 || 30 || 7:00 PM || Pittsburgh Penguins || 3–4 OT || New Jersey Devils || Prudential Center (17,625) || 24–21–5 || 53
|- style="background:#fcf;"
| 51 || 31 || 7:00 PM || Pittsburgh Penguins || 4–5 || Toronto Maple Leafs || Air Canada Centre (19,570) || 24–22–5 || 53
|-

|- style="background:#fcf;"
| 52 || 3 || 7:30 PM || Pittsburgh Penguins || 2–4 || Montreal Canadiens || Bell Centre (21,273) || 24–23–5 || 53
|- style="background:#cfc;"
| 53 || 4 || 7:30 PM || Tampa Bay Lightning || 3–4 OT || Pittsburgh Penguins || Civic Arena (16,977) || 25–23–5 || 55
|- style="background:#cfc;"
| 54 || 6 || 7:30 PM || Columbus Blue Jackets || 1–4 || Pittsburgh Penguins || Civic Arena (17,050) || 26–23–5 || 57
|- style="background:#fcf;"
| 55 || 8 || 12:30 PM || Detroit Red Wings || 3–0 || Pittsburgh Penguins || Civic Arena (17,132) || 26–24–5 || 57
|- style="background:#cfc;"
| 56 || 11 || 7:30 PM || San Jose Sharks || 1–2 SO || Pittsburgh Penguins || Civic Arena (17,034) || 27–24–5 || 59
|- style="background:#fcf;"
| 57 || 14 || 7:00 PM || Pittsburgh Penguins || 2–6 || Toronto Maple Leafs || Air Canada Centre (19,365) || 27–25–5 || 59
|- style="background:#ffc;"
| 58 || 16 || 2:00 PM || Pittsburgh Penguins || 2–3 SO || New York Islanders || Nassau Veterans Memorial Coliseum (16,234) || 27–25–6 || 60
|- style="background:#cfc;"
| 59 || 19 || 7:00 PM || Montreal Canadiens || 4–5 || Pittsburgh Penguins || Civic Arena (16,968) || 28–25–6 || 62
|- style="background:#cfc;"
| 60 || 21 || 1:00 PM || Pittsburgh Penguins || 5–4 || Philadelphia Flyers || Wells Fargo Center (19,992) || 29–25–6 || 64
|- style="background:#fcf;"
| 61 || 22 || 12:30 PM || Pittsburgh Penguins || 2–5 || Washington Capitals || Verizon Center (18,277) || 29–26–6 || 64
|- style="background:#cfc;"
| 62 || 25 || 7:30 PM || New York Islanders || 0–1 || Pittsburgh Penguins || Civic Arena (16,975) || 30–26–6 || 66
|- style="background:#cfc;"
| 63 || 27 || 8:30 PM || Pittsburgh Penguins || 5–4 OT || Chicago Blackhawks || United Center (22,689) || 31–26–6 || 68
|-

|- style="background:#cfc;"
| 64 || 1 || 3:00 PM || Pittsburgh Penguins || 4–1 || Dallas Stars || American Airlines Center (18,532) || 32–26–6 || 70
|- style="background:#cfc;"
| 65 || 3 || 7:30 PM || Pittsburgh Penguins || 3–1 || Tampa Bay Lightning || Amalie Arena (19,908) || 33–26–6 || 72
|- style="background:#cfc;"
| 66 || 5 || 7:30 PM || Pittsburgh Penguins || 4–1 || Florida Panthers || BB&T Center (18,933) || 34–26–6 || 74
|- style="background:#cfc;"
| 67 || 8 || 3:00 PM || Pittsburgh Penguins || 4–3 SO || Washington Capitals || Verizon Center (18,277) || 35–26–6 || 76
|- style="background:#cfc;"
| 68 || 10 || 7:30 PM || Florida Panthers || 3–4 SO || Pittsburgh Penguins || Civic Arena (17,132) || 36–26–6 || 78
|- style="background:#ffc;"
| 69 || 12 || 7:00 PM || Pittsburgh Penguins || 3–4 SO || Columbus Blue Jackets || Nationwide Arena (19,167) || 36–26–7 || 79
|- style="background:#ffc;"
| 70 || 14 || 3:00 PM || Ottawa Senators || 4–3 SO || Pittsburgh Penguins || Civic Arena (17,132) || 36–26–8 || 80
|- style="background:#cfc;"
| 71 || 15 || 3:00 PM || Boston Bruins || 4–6 || Pittsburgh Penguins || Civic Arena (17,132) || 37–26–8 || 82
|- style="background:#cfc;"
| 72 || 17 || 7:30 PM || Atlanta Thrashers || 2–6 || Pittsburgh Penguins || Civic Arena (17,088) || 38–26–8 || 84
|- style="background:#cfc;"
| 73 || 20 || 7:30 PM || Los Angeles Kings || 1–4 || Pittsburgh Penguins || Civic Arena (17,132) || 39–26–8 || 86
|- style="background:#fcf;"
| 74 || 22 || 12:30 PM || Philadelphia Flyers || 3–1 || Pittsburgh Penguins || Civic Arena (17,132) || 39–27–8 || 86
|- style="background:#cfc;"
| 75 || 25 || 7:30 PM || Calgary Flames || 0–2 || Pittsburgh Penguins || Civic Arena (17,083) || 40–27–8 || 88
|- style="background:#cfc;"
| 76 || 28 || 1:00 PM || New York Rangers || 3–4 || Pittsburgh Penguins || Civic Arena (17,110) || 41–27–8 || 90
|-

|- style="background:#cfc;"
| 77 || 1 || 7:30 PM || New Jersey Devils || 1–6 || Pittsburgh Penguins || Civic Arena (17,132) || 42–27–8 || 92
|- style="background:#ffc;"
| 78 || 4 || 7:00 PM || Pittsburgh Penguins || 2–3 OT || Carolina Hurricanes || PNC Arena (18,680) || 42–27–9 || 93
|- style="background:#fcf;"
| 79 || 5 || 5:00 PM || Pittsburgh Penguins || 2–4 || Florida Panthers || BB&T Center (18,232) || 42–28–9 || 93
|- style="background:#cfc;"
| 80 || 7 || 7:30 PM || Pittsburgh Penguins || 6–4 || Tampa Bay Lightning || Amalie Arena (19,538) || 43–28–9 || 95
|- style="background:#cfc;"
| 81 || 9 || 7:30 PM || New York Islanders || 1–6 || Pittsburgh Penguins || Civic Arena (17,132) || 44–28–9 || 97
|- style="background:#cfc;"
| 82 || 11 || 7:00 PM || Pittsburgh Penguins || 3–1 || Montreal Canadiens || Bell Centre (21,273) || 45–28–9 || 99
|-

|-
| Legend:       = Win       = Loss       = OT/SO Loss

Standings
Divisional standings

Conference standings

Detailed records
Final

Stanley Cup playoffs

The Penguins advanced to the Stanley Cup playoffs for the third consecutive season. They earned the fourth seed in the Eastern Conference and home-ice advantage in the opening round match-up against the Philadelphia Flyers, following a loss by the Flyers on the last day of the regular season. For the second consecutive season, the Penguins erected a 12 by 16 foot LED screen on the lawn directly outside Mellon Arena, allowing fans to watch all playoff games, free of charge. After defeating Philadelphia, the Penguins beat the Washington Capitals and the Carolina Hurricanes to advance to the Stanley Cup Finals. The Penguins faced the Detroit Red Wings, defeating them in seven games to win their third Stanley Cup in franchise history. The final game of the season drew a 42.2 television rating in Pittsburgh—the highest local rating in any city since the NHL began to track the figure.

Eastern Conference Quarterfinals
The Penguins won Game 1 of the series 4–1, with goals from Sidney Crosby, Evgeni Malkin, Tyler Kennedy and defenseman Mark Eaton. "It was a good [night] for me," said Malkin, "It was a good [night] for everybody." Flyers head coach John Stevens was fined US$10,000 and forward Daniel Carcillo was suspended by the NHL for the second game of the series for a hit to Maxime Talbot's head immediately following a faceoff with seven seconds left in the game; Carcillo was not penalized at the time of the hit. In Game 2, Evgeni Malkin had a goal and an assist, while Marc-Andre Fleury made 38 saves. Bill Guerin scored two goals, including the game winner in overtime, and the Penguins won 3–2. With the Penguins up two games to zero, the series moved to Philadelphia for Game 3. After falling behind 2–0, goals from Malkin and Rob Scuderi tied the game. Malkin added his second goal of the game in the final period; however, Philadelphia won the game 6–3. In Game 4, Fleury stopped 45 shots, giving up one goal as the Penguins won 3–1. Crosby scored his second goal of the playoffs and Tyler Kennedy added the game winner. The Penguins were unable to clinch the series in Game 5 at Mellon Arena. A goal by Malkin was taken away after it was determined that he had kicked the puck into the net; Martin Biron stopped 28 shots for the shutout. Pittsburgh viewers were unable to see approximately 30 minutes of the second period after a lightning strike at a FSN Pittsburgh network facility in Atlanta caused the station to temporarily black out.

In Game 6, the Flyers lead 3–0 four minutes into the second period. Maxime Talbot fought Daniel Carcillo after the Flyers tallied their third goal and the Penguins, re-energized by Talbot's display, scored three goals in what remained of the second period to tie the game 3–3. Sergei Gonchar scored his first goal of the series, his first in 23 playoff games dating back to game two of the Penguins' first-round series against Ottawa in 2008, to break the tie at 2:19 of the third period. Crosby added an empty-net goal and the Penguins eliminated the Flyers and advance to the Eastern Conference Semifinals. Three days after the Penguins series-clinching victory of the Flyers, the Penguins announced that Head Coach Dan Bylsma had signed a multi-year contract extension with the team.

Eastern Conference semi-finals 

The Penguins drew a matchup with the Washington Capitals in the second round semi-finals. The anticipation for the series was high considering the rivalry between the teams and star players, most notably Sidney Crosby and Evgeni Malkin of the Penguins and Alexander Ovechkin and Alexander Semin of the Capitals. The first three games in the series were scheduled for national television in the U.S., with game one on NBC and games two and three on Versus.

Game 1 was held in Washington, where Capitals owner Ted Leonsis took steps to prevent Penguins' fans from purchasing tickets, such as not selling tickets to customers whose 724 or 412 area code indicated they were from Western Pennsylvania. Crosby scored to give the Penguins a first period lead, but Washington scored two goals before the conclusion of the period. Mark Eaton tied the game in the second period, but Washington's Semyon Varlamov held the Penguins scoreless for the remainder of the game as the Capitals took a 1–0 lead in the series. The game had 40% more viewers than playoff games the previous season. In Game 2, Ovechkin and Crosby scored three goals each, though Dave Steckel's second period goal was the difference as Washington won 4–3.

The series moved to Pittsburgh for Game 3 with the Penguins down 2–0. Goals from Ruslan Fedotenko, Nicklas Backstrom, Ovechkin and Malkin left the game tied after regulation. Kris Letang scored a powerplay goal 11 minutes into overtime, winning the game for the Penguins. Pittsburgh tied the series at two games apiece after a 5–3 Game 4 victory at Mellon Arena. After a Washington goal scored less than a minute into regulation, the Penguins responded with three goals in the first period. The Penguins' five goals came from five different players. During the first period, Sergei Gonchar was forced to leave the game after a knee-on-knee hit from Ovechkin; Gonchar returned to the Penguins' line-up for Game 7. Game 5 took place in Washington, D.C., the next day, due to the scheduling of a Yanni concert in Pittsburgh. After a scoreless first period, Washington took a 2–1 lead in the second. Fedotenko tied the game less than a minute into the third period, but a goal by Matt Cooke was matched by Ovechkin and the game went into overtime. With one second remaining in their second powerplay of the game, Malkin scored to give the Penguins their third consecutive victory. Game 6 was the third overtime game of the series. Washington forced a seventh game with a 5–4 victory. Nine different players scored goals in the game.

In the final game of the series, Pittsburgh scored two goals within eight seconds of one another to take a 2–0 lead after Fleury stopped Ovechkin on a breakaway. Pittsburgh scored three more goals in the second period, extending their lead to 5–0, before Ovechkin scored his eighth goal of the series. Each team added a goal in the final period to end the game with a 6–2 final score. Ovechkin scored eight goals and added six assists in the series, while Crosby tallied eight goals and five assists. Crosby's 13-point tally in the series totalled one less than Ovechkin's 14 points, which was the highest single-series point total since the 1995 playoffs. While shaking hands following the final game, Crosby told Ovechkin he had played a "great series," to which Ovechkin responded, "win the Stanley Cup."

Eastern Conference Final 
Pittsburgh faced the Carolina Hurricanes in the Eastern Conference Final, after Carolina defeated the Boston Bruins and New Jersey Devils. The series opened in Pittsburgh, where Miroslav Satan and Philippe Boucher scored their first goals of the playoffs. Marc-Andre Fleury was named the game's third star after making 23 saves and helping the Penguins to a 3–2 victory. In Game 2, Malkin scored a hat-trick and Chris Kunitz scored his first goal of the playoffs as the Penguins won 7–4, taking a two games to none series lead. In Game 3, Malkin scored two goals and Crosby scored one as the Penguins took a 3–1 lead into the first intermission. After a scoreless second period, the Hurricanes came within a goal after Sergei Samsonov scored less than two minutes into the final period, but goals by Fedotenko, Craig Adams and Guerin gave the Penguins a 6–2 victory. The series concluded with the Penguins sweeping, four games to none. In the series' fourth game, Pittsburgh gave up the initial goal less than two minutes into the opening period, but goals from Fedotenko and Talbot gave them the lead after the first period. A second period goal from Guerin and an empty netter from Adams sealed the Penguins' victory in the game and the series.

Following Game 4, Crosby hoisted the Prince of Wales Trophy after refusing to touch it the previous season. As team captain, Mario Lemieux hoisted the Prince of Wales Trophy in 1991 and 1992, and the Penguins won the Stanley Cup each time.

Stanley Cup Final 

For the second consecutive season, the Penguins played the Detroit Red Wings in the Stanley Cup Finals, marking the first time in 25 years that two teams played each other in consecutive Finals. Tickets for Games 3 and 4, which were hosted at Mellon Arena, sold out in 10 minutes. In the first game of the series, the Red Wings scored the first goal when a puck shot by Brad Stuart ricocheted off the boards behind the goal, then bounced off Marc-Andre Fleury and into the net. Ruslan Fedotenko, with an assist from Evgeni Malkin, tied the game before the conclusion of the first period. Detroit went on to score a goal in each of the final two periods to win Game 1, 3–1. Evgeni Malkin scored a powerplay goal in the first period of game two, but the Penguins were held scoreless for the remainder of the contest; falling 3–1 for a second consecutive game.

With the Penguins down two games to none, the series shifted to Pittsburgh for Game 3. After a 2–2 first period and a scoreless second period, Sergei Gonchar and Maxime Talbot each scored a goal in the third period to give the Penguins a 4–2 victory. In Game 4, the Penguins tied the Red Wings at two games apiece with three unanswered goals in the second period, including a shorthanded goal by Jordan Staal. With the series returning to Detroit, the Red Wings took a three games to two lead in the series with a 5–0 win. Staal and Tyler Kennedy scored as the Penguins tied the series at three games apiece in a 2–1 game six victory. In the seventh and final game of the series, Maxime Talbot scored two goals and Fleury made 23 saves as the Penguins won their third Stanley Cup in franchise history.

Evgeni Malkin won the Conn Smythe Trophy as the MVP of the playoffs. Fans celebrated in the streets of Pittsburgh after the game, with the Stanley Cup victory coming four months after the Pittsburgh Steelers' victory in Super Bowl XLIII. Two days after the victory, 375,000 people attended a parade of the Cup through downtown Pittsburgh.

Playoff log

|- style="background:#cfc;"
| 1 || April 15||Philadelphia||1–4||Pittsburgh|| ||Crosby, Kennedy, Malkin, Eaton||Gagne||Fleury (1–0)||17,132||1–0||
|- style="background:#cfc;"
| 2 || April 17||Philadelphia||2–3||Pittsburgh||18:29||Malkin, Guerin, Guerin (OT)||Hartnell, Powe||Fleury (2–0)||17,132||2–0||
|- style="background:#fcf;"
| 3 || April 19||Pittsburgh||3–6||Philadelphia|| ||Malkin, Scuderi, Malkin||Carter, Richards, Giroux,Gagne, Ross, Gagne (en) ||Fleury (2–1)||19,745||2–1||
|- style="background:#cfc;"
| 4 || April 21||Pittsburgh||3–1||Philadelphia|| ||Crosby, Kennedy, Talbot (en)||Carcillo||Fleury (3–1)||19,745||3–1||
|- style="background:#fcf;"
| 5 || April 23||Philadelphia||3–0||Pittsburgh|| || ||Asham, Giroux, Knuble||Fleury (3–2)||17,132||3–2||
|- style="background:#cff;"
| 6 || April 25||Pittsburgh||5–3||Philadelphia|| ||Fedotenko, Eaton, Crosby,Gonchar, Crosby (en)||Knuble, Lupul, Briere||Fleury (4–2)||20,072||4–2||
|-

|- style="background:#fcf;"
| 1 ||May 2||Pittsburgh||2–3||Washington|| ||Crosby, Eaton||Steckel, Ovechkin, Fleischmann||Fleury (4–3)||18,277||0–1||
|- style="background:#fcf;"
| 2 ||May 4||Pittsburgh||3–4||Washington|| ||Crosby (3)||Ovechkin, Steckel, Ovechkin (2)||Fleury (4–4)||18,277|| 0–2||
|- style="background:#cfc;"
| 3 ||May 6||Washington||2–3||Pittsburgh||11:23||Fedotenko, Malkin, Letang ||Ovechkin, Backstrom||Fleury (5–4)||17,132||1–2||
|- style="background:#cfc;"
| 4 ||May 8||Washington||3–5||Pittsburgh||||Gonchar, Guerin, Fedotenko, Crosby, Talbot||Backstrom, Clark, Jurcina||Fleury (6–4)||17,132||2–2||
|- style="background:#cfc;"
| 5 ||May 9||Pittsburgh||4–3||Washington||3:28||Staal, Fedotenko, Cooke, Malkin||Ovechkin, Backstrom, Ovechkin||Fleury (7–4)||18,277||3–2||
|- style="background:#fcf;"
| 6 ||May 11||Washington||5–4||Pittsburgh||6:22||Guerin, Eaton, Letang, Crosby||Kozlov, Fleischmann, Laich, Kozlov,  Steckel||Fleury (7–5)||17,132||3–3||
|- style="background:#cff;"
| 7 ||May 13||Pittsburgh||6–2||Washington|| ||Crosby, Adams, Guerin, Letang, Staal, Crosby||Ovechkin, Laich||Fleury (8–5)||18,277||4–3||
|-

|- style="background:#cfc;"
| 1 ||May 18||Carolina||2–3||Pittsburgh|| ||Satan, Malkin, Boucher||LaRose, Corvo||Fleury (9–5)||17,132||1–0||
|- style="background:#cfc;"
| 2 ||May 21||Carolina||4–7||Pittsburgh|| ||Crosby, Malkin, Talbot, Kunitz, Malkin 2, Kennedy||Larose, Jokinen, Seidenberg, Eaves||Fleury (10–5)||17,132||2–0||
|- style="background:#cfc;"
| 3 ||May 23|| Pittsburgh||6–2||Carolina|| ||Malkin, Crosby, Malkin, Fedotenko, Adams, Guerin||Cullen, Samsonov||Fleury (11–5)||18,789||3–0||
|- style="background:#cff;"
| 4 ||May 26|| Pittsburgh||4–1||Carolina|| ||Fedotenko, Talbot, Guerin, Adams||Staal||Fleury (12–5)||18,680||4–0||
|-

|- style="background:#fcf;"
| 1 ||May 30||Pittsburgh||1–3||Detroit||||Fedotenko||Stuart, Franzen, Abdelkader||Fleury (12–6)||20,066||0–1||
|- style="background:#fcf;"
| 2 ||May 31||Pittsburgh||1–3||Detroit||||Malkin||Ericsson, Filppula, Abdelkader||Fleury (12–7)||20,066||0–2||
|- style="background:#cfc;"
| 3 ||June 2||Detroit||2–4||Pittsburgh||||Talbot, Letang, Gonchar, Talbot||Zetterberg, Franzen||Fleury (13–7)||17,132||1–2||
|- style="background:#cfc;"
| 4 ||June 4||Detroit||2–4||Pittsburgh||||Malkin, Staal, Crosby, Kennedy ||Helm, Stuart||Fleury (14–7)||17,132||2–2||
|- style="background:#fcf;"
| 5 ||June 6||Pittsburgh||0–5||Detroit|| || ||Cleary, Filppula, Kronwall, Rafalski, Zetterberg||Fleury (14–8)||20,066||2–3||
|- style="background:#cfc;"
| 6 ||June 9||Detroit||1–2||Pittsburgh|| ||Staal, Kennedy||Draper||Fleury (15–8)||17,132||3–3||
|- style="background:#cff;"
| 7 ||June 12||Pittsburgh||2–1||Detroit|| ||Talbot (2)||Ericsson||Fleury (16–8)||20,066||4–3||
|-

|-
| Legend:       = Win       = Loss       = Playoff series win

 Scorer of game-winning goal in italics

Player statistics
Skaters

Goaltenders

†Denotes player spent time with another team before joining Team.  Stats reflect time with the Team only.
‡Denotes player was traded mid-season.  Stats reflect time with the Team only.
Bold/italics denotes franchise record

Awards and records

Records

Milestones

Awards

Prior to the team's final home game on April 9 against the New York Islanders, the team announced its annual award winners. Awards were given by the Pittsburgh chapter of the Professional Hockey Writers Association, the Penguins Booster Club, as well as voted amongst the team.

Transactions
Concerns over future player contracts were raised just days after the 2008 Stanley Cup Finals. Approximately a dozen players, including Marian Hossa, Jarkko Ruutu, Ryan Malone and Brooks Orpik, had fulfilled the final year on their contracts. On June 28, the Penguins traded the contract negotiation rights to Gary Roberts and Ryan Malone to the Tampa Bay Lightning for a conditional draft pick; it became a third-round pick when both Malone and Roberts signed with the Lightning on June 30. Evgeni Malkin was offered a contract from a Russian team in the newly formed Kontinental Hockey League (KHL) worth approximately $12.5 million, tax exempt, per year, which would make him the highest-paid hockey player in the world. However, Malkin turned down the offer to remain with the Penguins, and the IIHF released a statement saying that it would not honor the offer, as Malkin was already under an existing contract with the Penguins at the time. Malkin agreed to a five-year contract extension worth $8.7 million per year—the same value as Sidney Crosby's contract—with the Penguins on July 2. On July 3, the Penguins agreed to a seven-year deal with restricted free agent goaltender Marc-Andre Fleury in addition to one-year contracts with free agents Miroslav Satan and Ruslan Fedotenko. On October 8, the Penguins made several roster adjustments, placing Kris Beech, who was already in Europe looking for a new team, on unconditional waivers and sending Janne Pesonen, John Curry and Jeff Taffe, who first had to clear waivers, to Wilkes-Barre/Scranton. The next day, on October 9, the Penguins acquired Michael Zigomanis from Phoenix for future considerations. On December 19, the team extended their agreement with Maxime Talbot for an additional two seasons.

Trades

Free agents signed by Pittsburgh

Signed with new team

Claimed from waivers

Draft picks
The 2008 NHL Entry Draft was held on June 20–21, 2008, in Ottawa, Ontario. The Penguins did not make their first selection until the fourth round, at 120th overall.

Draft notes
 The Pittsburgh Penguins' first-round pick went to the Atlanta Thrashers as the result of a February 26, 2008 trade that sent Marian Hossa and Pascal Dupuis to the Penguins in exchange for Angelo Esposito, Colby Armstrong, Erik Christensen and this pick.
 The Pittsburgh Penguins' second-round pick went to the Toronto Maple Leafs as the result of a February 26, 2008 trade that sent Hal Gill to the Penguins in exchange for a 2009 fifth-round pick and this pick.
 The Pittsburgh Penguins' third-round pick went to the Phoenix Coyotes as the result of a February 27, 200 trade that sent Georges Laraque to the Penguins in exchange for Daniel Carcillo and this pick.

Farm teams
Pittsburgh's American Hockey League affiliate, the Wilkes-Barre/Scranton Penguins, finished the 2008–09 season third in the East Division.

Chris Minard, the AHL's leading goal scorer at time of announcement, was selected as a starter for Team Canada in the 2009 All Star Classic. Jeff Taffe and Ben Lovejoy were selected as reserves for the PlanetUSA team. All three players were under two-way NHL contracts and played games with Pittsburgh during the season. In the game, Taffe scored three goals and recorded two assists.

Janne Pesonen, who signed a contract with the Penguins in July 2008, finished the 2008–09 season as the AHL's fourth-leading scorer, set a new record for points in a single season for the team, surpassing Toby Petersen's 67-point season in 2000–01, and his 82 points were the most ever by a Finn in AHL history.

The ECHL affiliate Wheeling Nailers finished the season fourth in the Northern Division, and were eliminated in the first round of the 2009 Kelly Cup Playoffs.

The Nailers had three players selected for the 2009 ECHL All-Star Game, all reserve forwards. Nick Johnson, the only Penguins prospect, was drafted by the team 67th overall in 2004 and signed an entry-level contract with the organization in March 2008. Johnson did not play in the All-Star Game because he finished the season with Wilkes-Barre/Scranton.

Media affiliates 
WXDX-FM 105.9 of Pittsburgh was the radio flagship station for the Penguins for the third season. In April, the team and the station agreed to a six-year contract extension. Mike Lange, former Penguin Phil Bourque and Bob Grove were the station's broadcasters.

FSN Pittsburgh was the primary television network. Paul Steigerwald, Dan Potash, Rob King, and former Penguins Bob Errey and Jay Caufield were the station's broadcast team. During the semi-final playoff round against the Washington Capitals, game five set a record as the highest watched game on any FSN regional network in history. It was then surpassed by games six and seven; the final game of the series drew a 24.97 average rating—twice the viewers than the second most watched show of the evening.

See also
 2008–09 NHL season

References 

Pittsburgh Penguins seasons
P
P
Eastern Conference (NHL) championship seasons
Stanley Cup championship seasons
Pitts
Pitts
Pitts